Dana J. Ferrell (born April 17, 1961) is an American politician serving as a member of the West Virginia House of Delegates from the 39th district. He assumed office on December 1, 2020.

Early life and education 
Ferrell was born in Charleston, West Virginia in 1961. He earned an Associate of Applied Science in management and marketing and a Bachelor of Science in business education from West Virginia State University, followed by a Master of Arts in special education from Marshall University.

Career 
Outside of politics, Ferrell has worked as a teacher and as the president of the RSN Sports Network. He was elected to the West Virginia House of Delegates in November 2020 and assumed office on December 1, 2020.

References 

1961 births
Living people
People from Charleston, West Virginia
West Virginia State University alumni
Marshall University alumni
Republican Party members of the West Virginia House of Delegates